Gandhinagar North is one of the 183 Legislative Assembly constituencies of Gujarat state in India. It is part of Gandhinagar district. The seat came into existence after 2008 delimitation after division of erstwhile Gandhinagar seat and was numbered as 36-Gandhinagar North.  It is one of the seven assembly seats which make up Gandhinagar Lok Sabha seat.

List of segments
This assembly seat represents the following segments,

 Gandhinagar Taluka (Part) Villages – Rupal, Vasan, Unava, Pindharada, Piplaj, Randheja, Sonipur, Sardhav, Jalund, Adraj Moti, Kolavada, Pethapur, Vavol, Gandhinagar (NAC).

Members of Legislative Assembly

Election results

2022

2017

2012

See also
 List of constituencies of the Gujarat Legislative Assembly
 Gandhinagar district

References

External links
 

Assembly constituencies of Gujarat
Gandhinagar district